Cnicus benedictus, known by the common names St. Benedict's thistle, blessed thistle, holy thistle and spotted thistle, is a thistle-like plant in the family Asteraceae, native to the Mediterranean region, from Portugal north to southern France and east to Iran. It is known in other parts of the world, including parts of North America, as an introduced species and often a noxious weed. It is the sole species in the monotypic genus Cnicus. Other species once included in the genus have largely been reclassified to Cirsium, Carduus, and Centaurea.

The related genus Notobasis is included in Cnicus by some botanists; it differs in slender, much spinier leaves, and purple flowers.

Growth 
It is an annual plant growing to 60 cm tall, with leathery, hairy leaves up to 30 cm long and 8 cm broad, with small spines on the margins. The flowers are yellow, produced in a dense flowerhead (capitulum) 3–4 cm diameter, surrounded by numerous spiny basal bracts. Blessed thistle blooms mid summer to early fall.

All parts of the plant have a light down covering. This plant has a sprawling habit instead of standing upright. It needs full sun to grow and good soil drainage, as it will die in waterlogged soil. Water blessed thistle daily if you want your plant to produce lush leaves.

Seeds are too large to start in most seed trays, so it is recommended to sow outside after the danger of frost passes. Bury the seed 1/4 inch in the soil which should remain most until germination that takes between two to three weeks. Leave at least 12 to 15 inches of space between plants.

In literature

In Shakespeare’s comedy Much Ado About Nothing, “Carduus Benedictus”, in tincture form, is recommended for a cold.  The pointed allusion, by Margaret, is to Beatrice’s tormentor-lover, Benedict.

Edibility and medicinal use
These thistles are not considered edible, unlike Cirsium, Arctium and Onopordum species; the leaves are considered unpalatable if not bitter.

Blessed thistle is mostly used for medicinal purposes. Cnicin, the main component in this herb, is considered to have antibacterial properties, and to be anti-cancer and anti-inflammatory. This plant was used to treat the Black Plague during the Middle Ages. Now it is mostly used as a galactagogue with other herbs to increase breast milk supply. It is also used to aid the digestive system and detoxify the liver just like milk thistle.

Blessed thistle can help neutralize bacteria such as E. Coli, Staphylococcus aureus, and Bacillus subtilis. Cnicin blocks the enzymes necessary for bacteria replication so they are not able to reproduce and die.

References

 Jepson Manual Treatment

External links

 Cnicus Benedictus.—Blessed Thistle
 Spotted thistle entry in the public domain NCI Dictionary of Cancer Terms

Cynareae
Galactagogues
Medicinal plants of Asia
Medicinal plants of Europe
Monotypic Asteraceae genera